Mount Olive is an unincorporated community in Stokes County, North Carolina, United States, approximately five miles north of King on North Carolina State Highway 66.

It is not to be confused with Mount Olive, Wayne County, North Carolina.

Unincorporated communities in Stokes County, North Carolina
Unincorporated communities in North Carolina